For the Summer Olympics, there are 24 venues starting with the letter 'T', seven venues starting with the letter 'U', and 17 venues starting with the letter 'V'.

T

U

V

References

 List T-V